HMS Chaser (D32/R306/A727) was an American-built  that served with the Royal Navy during the Second World War.

She spent most of her career escorting convoys in Arctic, she transferred to the British Pacific Fleet in March 1945.

Construction
Chaser was laid down on 28 June 1941, under a Maritime Commission contract, MC hull 162, by Ingalls Shipbuilding, in Pascagoula, Mississippi, as Mormacgulf. Her name was changed to Mormacdove on 5 December 1941. She was launched on 19 June 1942, sponsored by Mrs. Eugene T. Oates. After she was acquired by the US Navy, she was renamed Breton and designated AVG-10. On 20 August 1942, she was reclassified ACV-10. On 9 April, she was again reclassified, now CVE-10, and transferred to the Royal Navy under the Lend-Lease program and commissioned as HMS Chaser.

Design and description
There were eleven Attacker-class in service with the Royal Navy during the Second World War. They were built between 1941 and 1942, by Seattle-Tacoma Shipbuilding Corporation, Ingalls Shipbuilding, and Western Pipe & Steel shipyards in the United States.

The ship had complement of 646 men, who lived in crew accommodation that was significantly different from the arrangements that were normal for the Royal Navy at the time. The separate messes no longer had to prepare their own food, as everything was cooked in the galley and served cafeteria style in a central dining area. They were also equipped with a modern laundry and a barber shop. The traditional hammocks were replaced by three-tier bunk-beds, 18 to a cabin, which were hinged and could be tied up to provide extra space when not in use.

She displaced  at full load.

She had the operating capacity for up to 24 aircraft, which could be a mixture of anti-submarine and fighter aircraft; the British Hawker Sea Hurricane and Supermarine Seafire naval fighters, Fairey Swordfish torpedo bomber or the American-supplied Grumman Martlet and Vought F4U Corsair fighters or Grumman Avenger torpedo bomber could be carried. The exact composition of the embarked squadrons depended upon the mission. Some squadrons were composite squadrons for convoy defence and would be equipped with both anti-submarine and fighter aircraft, while other squadrons working in a strike carrier role would only be equipped with fighter aircraft. Aircraft facilities were a small combined bridge–flight control on the starboard side and above the  flight deck, two aircraft lifts , and nine arrestor wires. Aircraft could be housed in the  hangar below the flight deck. When employed as an aircraft transport she could carry 90 aircraft.

The ships armament concentrated on anti-aircraft (AA) defence and consisted of eight  Bofors guns in twin mounts and ten  Oerlikon cannons in single and eight in twin mounts. In addition, she had two 4 inch (102 mm)/50 caliber Mk 9 guns.

Chaser was designed to accompany other ships forming the escort for convoys. The anti-submarine aircraft employed were initially the Fairey Swordfish and later the Grumman Avenger, which could be armed with torpedoes, depth charges,  bombs or RP-3 rocket projectiles. As well as carrying out their own attacks on U-boats, these aircraft identified their locations for the convoy's escorts to mount an attack. Typically anti-submarine patrols would be flown between dawn and dusk. One aircraft would fly about  ahead of the convoy, while another patrolled astern. Patrols would last between two and three hours, using both radar and visual observation in their search for U-boats.

Chaser also had a secondary role, providing oil and provisions for her accompanying destroyers. This could be a lengthy process and was done on the move. It took 40 minutes from firing a line across to the destroyer to start pumping oil, while it took another two hours to pump 98 tons of oil and a further 35 minutes to disconnect the hose pipe and secure the equipment.

Service history
After workup in the Chesapeake Bay area, Chaser embarked 845 Squadron, which had been formed in the US, on 23 June 1943, for passage across the Atlantic. She crossed the Atlantic in company with Convoy HX 245, arriving at the Clyde on 6 July 1943.

On 7 July 1943, there was an explosion in Chasers boiler room. She was repaired at Rosyth Dockyard. On 29 October, with her repairs completed, she returned to the Clyde, where she was allocated to the Western Approaches Command. She embarked 835 Squadron equipped with Fairey Swordfish and Sea Hurricanes for workup. On 29 November, Chaser returned to the Clyde for further defect rectification. These repairs would continue for the remainder of the year. Upon the return to active duty she was attached to the Home Fleet for convoy duty on the Russian convoy route, embarking 816 Squadrons, equipped with Swordfish and Grumman Wildcats, and sailed for Scapa Flow.

Arctic duty
On 22 January 1944, Chaser joined Convoy JW 57, which had left Loch Ewe the previous day, for escort to the Kola Inlet. She was the first escort carrier assigned to provide protection for large convoys as they steamed to Russia. Chasers Wildcats helped to drive off German aircraft shadowing the convoy, while her Swordfish made several unsuccessful attacks against German submarines. On 24 February, one of Chaser Swordfishes spotted the submarine  on the surface and called up the destroyer  which sank the U-boat with depth charges. A second submarine  was sunk by a shore based flying boat, while one escorting destroyer,  was sunk by a U-boat. None of the 43 merchant ships comprising the convoy was hit by the 14 U-boats deployed in two patrol lines against the convoy.

Chaser joined the return convoy, RA 57 of 33 merchant ships, on 2 March. On 4 March, one of Chasers Swordfish caught  on the surface. U-472 was unable to defend itself as its anti-aircraft guns were iced up, and the Swordfish attacked with bombs and rockets, damaging the submarine, and then called up the destroyer  which finished off the submarine with gunfire. On 6 March, radio signals from a submarine were detected by HF/DF and a Swordfish was sent to investigate. One merchant ship was sunk.

After returning to Loch Ewe on 10 March, Chaser dragged her anchor and ran aground on 13 March, being towed off the next day. She had her hull repaired and was refitted at Rosyth and was then modified for service as a ferry carrier with the Pacific Fleet at Belfast.

Pacific duty
On 14 February 1945, Chaser left Britain on the first part of the journey to join the British Pacific Fleet, arriving in Sydney in May 1945, where she was attached to the 30th Aircraft Carrier Squadron. She was designated as a replenishment carrier, tasked with ferrying replacement aircraft to the forward areas where they could be transferred to the operational carriers. Chaser ferried aircraft to support British Pacific fleet operations during the invasion of Okinawa and operations off Japan in July–August 1945. Owing to a shortage to dedicated tankers, Chaser was also used to refuel other ships.

Following the Japanese surrender in August 1945, she transported Allied prisoners of war homeward.

Decommissioning
The escort carrier was returned to the United States Navy at Norfolk, Virginia on 12 May 1946, and the ship was struck from the US Navy list on 3 August 1946. She was sold to the Waterman Steamship Co. on 20 December 1946 and later resold to the Netherlands.

Merchant service
She was renamed Aagtekerk in civilian service and was later renamed E Yung. The ship foundered on 4 December 1972, and was salvaged and then scrapped in Taiwan.

FAA squadrons

References

Bibliography

 
 
 
 
 
 
 
   
 
 
 
  
 
 

 

Type C3-S-A1 ships of the Royal Navy
Bogue-class escort carriers
Attacker-class escort carriers
Ships built in Pascagoula, Mississippi
1943 ships
World War II aircraft carriers of the United Kingdom